The Sahitya Akademi Award has been given each year since 1955 by Sahitya Akademi (India's National Academy of Letters) to writers and their works, for their outstanding contribution to the upliftment of Indian and Meitei literature (Manipuri literature). No awards were given in 1975 and 1980.

Winners

Note: No awards in 1975 and 1980.

See also 
 List of Yuva Puraskar winners for Meitei
 List of epics in Meitei language
 Meitei literature
 Meitei Language Day
 History of Manipur

References

External links 
 Recipient of Sahitya Akademi Award in Manipuri, Official list at Sahitya Akademi Award website
 Review of Meeteilon or Manipuri Books
 Manipuri Literature

Manipuri

Literary awards by language
Meitei-language literary awards
Meitei language-related lists
Manipur-related lists